The Iceland national football team is the representative association football affiliated to FIFA. The team played its first match on 17 July 1946 against Denmark and played only friendly matches for the first eleven years of its existence before participating in the qualification campaign for the 1958 FIFA World Cup. Iceland have played a total of 402 international fixtures as of 16 October 2012. More than 400 players have represented Iceland in international football; of these, Rúnar Kristinsson has won the most caps with a total of 104 between 1987 and 2004, making him the only Icelander to make more than 100 appearances for the country. Conversely, the Iceland careers of 78 of those players consisted of a single international cap.

Former Chelsea and Barcelona forward Eiður Guðjohnsen is the all-time leading goalscorer for Iceland, with 24 goals in 74 matches. Ríkharður Jónsson scored the second-most goals with 17, while Guðjohnsen's father Arnór is joint-third in the rankings alongside Ríkharður Daðason on 14 goals.

Key

List of players

References
General

Specific

 
Association football player non-biographical articles